Carlos Mejía may refer to:
Carlos Mejia (equestrian) (1894–?), Mexican equestrian
Carlos Mejía Godoy (born 1943), Nicaraguan musician
Carlos Mejia (boxer) (born 1957), Colombian boxer
Carlos Mejía (footballer, born 1991), Guatemalan football defender
Carlos Will Mejía (born 1983), Honduran football attacking midfielder
Carlos Mejía (footballer, born 2000), Honduran football midfielder